The Mesnieraceae are a family of fungi with an uncertain taxonomic placement in the class Dothideomycetes.

References

External links 
Index Fungorum

Dothideomycetes enigmatic taxa
Ascomycota families